Denton Airport  is a town owned, public use airport located in Denton, a town in Fergus County, Montana, United States.

Facilities and aircraft 
Denton Airport resides at elevation of 3,594 feet (1,095 m) above mean sea level. It has one runway designated 9/27 with a turf surface measuring 2,550 by 180 feet (777 x 55 m). For the 12-month period ending July 20, 2011, the airport had 550 general aviation aircraft operations, an average of 45 per month.

References

External links 
 Aerial image as of September 1997 from USGS The National Map
 

Airports in Montana
Buildings and structures in Fergus County, Montana
Transportation in Fergus County, Montana